Roman Sergeyevich Piletsky (born 14 June 2003) is a Belarusian professional footballer who plays for Naftan Novopolotsk on loan from BATE Borisov.

References

External links 
 
 

2003 births
Living people
Belarusian footballers
Association football midfielders
FC BATE Borisov players
FC Slutsk players
FC Naftan Novopolotsk players